Centauri Montes is a group of mountains in the Hellas quadrangle of Mars, located at . It is 270 km across and was named after the albedo feature Centauri Lacus. According to NASA, there are light-sediment gulley deposits that have formed in a crater around the Centauri Montes.

References

Hellas quadrangle
Mountains on Mars